The 2017–18 Weber State Wildcats men's basketball team represented Weber State University during the 2017–18 NCAA Division I men's basketball season. The Wildcats were led by 12th-year head coach Randy Rahe and play their home games in the Dee Events Center in Ogden, Utah as members of the Big Sky Conference. They finished the season 20–11, 13–5 in Big Sky play to finish in a tie for third place. They lost in the quarterfinals of the Big Sky tournament to Northern Colorado.

Previous season
The Wildcats finished the 2016–17 season 20–14, 12–6 in Big Sky play to finish in a tie for third place. As the No. 3 seed in the Big Sky tournament, they defeated Southern Utah and Eastern Washington before losing in the championship game to North Dakota. They were invited to the CollegeInsider.com Postseason Tournament where they defeated Cal State Fullerton in the first round to win the Riley Wallace Classic. In the second round, they lost to Texas A&M–Corpus Christi.

Offseason

Departures

2017 recruiting class

Roster

Schedule and results

|-
!colspan=9 style=| Exhibition

|-
!colspan=9 style=| Non-conference regular season

|-
!colspan=9 style=| Big Sky regular season

|-
!colspan=9 style=|Big Sky tournament

References

Weber State Wildcats men's basketball seasons
Weber State
Weber State Wildcats men's basketball
Weber State Wildcats men's basketball